"Feel What U Feel" is a song by American musician Lisa Loeb, from her 2016 children's album, Feel What U Feel. The song features guest vocals from the actor/ comedian Craig Robinson.

Release
Loeb unexpectedly announced the release of the song on her Instagram account, and the song was released for a free listen on SoundCloud.

Composition
The song is based on the ideals that she would pass down to her kids. “I wrote this album for what I’d like to pass along to my kids and kids in general,” said Loeb, “For this album, I wrote a song about ‘seeing’ and acknowledging others, in the song ‘Say Hello,’ and for kids to just have their feelings in ‘Feel What U Feel’ and not to judge them.”

Music video
A music video for the song was released, which features Loeb and Robinson with some kids.

Track listing

Chart performance
It was requested every day for nearly a year to be played on the Absolutely Mindy Show on SIRIUS XM Radio.

Charts

References

2016 songs
Lisa Loeb songs
Children's songs
Songs written by Lisa Loeb